St. Augustine's Church was a Church of England church located on Whitchurch Lane in Whitchurch, Bristol.

History

Construction 

The church was built in 1972 to cater for the expansion of Whitchurch Parish in the suburb of south Bristol, England, UK.

Closure 

St Augustine's Church had many structural problems. Rainwater had penetrated the roof after lead was stolen.  In 2004 the city council planners gave consent to demolish the church and build a new structure. The church was deemed unsafe in 2007 and closed.

Re-build 

Parishioners hoped to raise up to £50,000 towards the £350,000 cost of the new church. Following concerns about the lack of progress, Canon Nicholas Hay was appointed as caretaker minister. 
Construction work on a new church was completed in 2016.
In 2021 the reverend Sam Sheppard was appointed priest in charge of the new team of St Augustines Whitchurch and Christ Church Hengrove

Archives
Records for St Augustine's church, Whitchurch are held at Bristol Archives (Ref. P.WchStA)  (online catalogue) consisting of one marriage register and two service registers.

See also 

 List of churches in Bristol

References

External links 
Page on ChurchCrawler http://www.churchcrawler.co.uk/bristol5/augwhit.htm

Church of England church buildings in Bristol
Christian organizations established in 1972